Clara Law Cheuk-yiu (born 29 May 1957 in Macau) is a Hong Kong Second Wave film director. Law currently resides in Australia.

Early life

Clara Law was born on 29 May 1957 in Macau. At the age of 10 she moved to Hong Kong. Law studied at the University of Hong Kong and graduated with a degree in English Literature. In 1978 she joined Radio Television Hong Kong as an assistant producer and director. During her time there she tried many aspects of television from screenwriting to directing. Between 1978 and 1981 she directed twelve drama programs for the television channel. In 1982 she began studying film direction and writing at the National Film and Television School in England. She won the Silver Plaque Award at the Chicago Film Festival in 1985 for her graduation film They Say the Moon is Fuller Here.

Career

1985–1994

In 1985 she returned to Hong Kong and began development on her first long feature film The Other Half and the Other Half, which was released in 1988. Since her return to Hong Kong she has worked with Eddie Fong on all of her projects. In 1989 she created her second film The Reincarnation of Golden Lotus. The film was screened at the Toronto Film Festival and was released commercially in the US. A year later she created Farewell China. It won the Special Jury Award at the Torino Film Festival. She was also nominated for best director at the Hong Kong Film Awards for the film. She directed Fruit Punch in 1991, which was a commercial film produced by a large Hong Kong film studio. In 1992 she directed and produced Autumn Moon. The film was a hit in the film festival circuit. It won the Golden Leopard Award at the Locarno Film Festival in 1992, as well as the European Art Theatres Association Best Picture Award and the Youth Special Jury Award in Switzerland and the Best Screenplay in Valencia (1994). It was also awarded at the Belgium and Portugal film festivals. Autumn Moon was selected for official screenings at the New York Film Festival as well as in Sundance, Toronto, London, Rotterdam, Gothenburg, Thessaloniki, Nantes, San Francisco, Créteil, Dublin, Puerto Rico, Seattle, Jerusalem, New Delhi, Wellington, Midnight Sun Finland, Rio de Janeiro, Reykjavik, Ghent, Munich, Ankara, Sydney and Melbourne. In 1993 she released Temptation of a Monk. The film is an adaptation of a novella by Lillian Lee. The film was shot entirely on location in the north and northwestern part of China. The film was selected for competition at the Venice Film Festival in 1993. It won the Grand Prix at the Créteil International Film Festival in France (1994). The film was also selected for official screenings at the Toronto, Sundance, Rotterdam and Brisbane film festivals, and as the closing film at the L.A. Film Festival. In 1994, Law finished a segment of the movie Erotique called Wonton Soup. Later that year she and Eddie Fong moved to Australia.

1994 – present

She moved to Australia with Eddie Fong in 1994. The pair's first film after their move to Australia is Floating Life, which was completed in 1996. It won the Silver Leopard Award at the Locarno Film Festival in 1996, and two other awards including Best Film, it was selected by Prix FICC and the "Ambiente salute: Qualita di vita" award. It also won the Best Film and Best Director Awards at the Gijon International Film Festival in Spain, and the Grand Prix at the Créteil International Film Festival in France. It was nominated for three awards at the Australian Film Institute Awards including Best Director and Best Screenplay, and it received nine nominations at the Golden Horse International Film Festival in Taiwan, including the awards for Best Film, Best Director and Best Screenplay. Floating Life was also Australia's official entry in the Best Foreign Language Film category at the 69th Academy Awards (1997). The film was also screened at the Sydney, Melbourne, London, Rotterdam, Hof, Stockholm, Toronto and Hawaii film festivals. The Goddess of 1967, shot on location in the outback of Australia and Tokyo, was completed in 2000. It was in competition at the Venice film festival in 2000 where Rose Byrne won the Best Actress Award. What's more, Clara Law was nominated for the Golden Lion in Venice. The film also pocketed the Best Director Award at the Chicago International Film Festival, the Best Director Award at the Teplice Art Film Festival in Slovakia and the FIPRESCI Critics' Award for Best Film at the Tromsø Film Festival in Norway. The film was also selected for official screenings at the Toronto, London, Pusan, Hof, Vancouver, Hawaii, Taipei, Rotterdam, Jerusalem, Karlovy Vary and Oslo film festivals. She directed her first digital documentary in 2004 called Letters to Ali with Eddie Fong who co-produced, edited, and shot the film. The film was selected for competition at the Venice Film Festival and for official screenings at the Toronto, Pusan, Gothenburg and Melbourne film festivals. She completed Like a Dream in 2009. This film marked her return to Asia. The film was nominated in nine categories at the 2009 Golden Horse Awards. It also opened the 2010 Hong Kong International Film Festival. In 2010, Law made a short film, Red Earth, commissioned by the Hong Kong International Film Festival. The short was selected in the Horizon category at the 2010 Venice film festival.

Filmography

 Drifting Petals – 2020
The Unbearable Lightness of Inspector Fan (also known as Shanghai Noir) – 2015
 Red Earth – 2010 – Short
 Like a Dream – 2009
 Letters to Ali – 2004 – Documentary
 The Goddess of 1967 – 2000
 Floating Life – 1996
 Wonton Soup – 1994
 Temptation of a Monk – 1993
 Autumn Moon – 1992
 Fruit Punch – 1991
 Farewell China – 1990
 The Reincarnation of the Golden Lotus – 1989
 The Other Half and the Other Half – 1988
 Faces and Places – 1981
 Police Drama – 1980
 Below the Lion Rock – 1977

Awards and nominations

They Say the Moon Is Fuller Here

1985
The Silver Plaque Award, Chicago Film Festival

Farewell China

1991 
Best Director Nominee, Hong Kong Film Awards
Special Jury Award, Torino Film Festival.

Autumn Moon

1992
Golden Leopard Winner, Locarno International Film Festival
Best Picture Award, European Art Theatres Association.

Temptation of a Monk

1994 
Best Director Nominee, Hong Kong Film Awards
Grand Prix, Gréteil International Film Festival.

Floating Life

1996
Silver Leopard Winner, Locarno International Film Festival
Best Director Nominee, AFI Award, Australian Film Institute
Best Director and Grand Prix Asturias Winners, Gijón International Film Festival, Spain.
Best Director and Best Screenplay Nominee, Taipei Golden Horse Film Festival, Taiwan
1997 
Grand Prix Winner, Grétail International Women's Film Festival, France.

The Goddess of 1967

2000
Silver Hugo Winner (Best Director), Chicago International Film Festival
Golden Lion Nominee, Venice Film Festival.
2001
Golden Key Winner (Best Direction), Art Film Festival, Slovak Republic
FIPRESCI Award Winner, Tromsø International Film Festival, Norway.

Like a Dream

2009
Nominated in nine categories, Taipei Golden Horse Film Festival, Taiwan

Drifting Petals

2020
Best Director Winner, Taipei Golden Horse Film Festival, Taiwan

See also

List of graduates of University of Hong Kong

Notes

References
Podvin, Thomas, Hong Kong Cinemagic, 2010.
Lee, Dian, Senses of Cinema, 2003.
Tong, Nancy, "From the Chinese Diaspora to a Global Dream: A Discussion With Filmmakers Clara Law and Eddie Fong", Hong Kong Cinemagic, 2010.

Further reading
 Shen, Shiao-ying. "Filming One's Way Home: Clara Law's Letters to Oz." In: Wang, Lingzhen. Chinese Women's Cinema: Transnational Contexts. Columbia University Press, 13 August 2013. Start page 16. , 9780231527446.

External links
 
 Complete biography on Hong Kong Cinemagic
 Interview with Clara Law on Hong Kong Cinemagic
 Biography on Senses of Cinema
 List of films on Film Reference

1957 births
Living people
Hong Kong film directors
Australian people of Chinese descent
Hong Kong emigrants to Australia
Australian film directors
English-language film directors
Australian women film directors
Alumni of the University of Hong Kong
Macau people
Hong Kong artists
Hong Kong women artists